The siege of Rouen (29 July 1418 – 19 January 1419) was a major event in the Hundred Years' War, where English forces loyal to Henry V captured Rouen, the capital of Normandy, from the Norman French.

Background
At the time of the siege the city had a population of 20,000, making it one of the leading cities in France, and its capture crucial to the Normandy campaign. From about 1415, Rouen had been strengthened and reinforced by the French and it was the most formidably defended place that the invaders had yet faced. The previous year Henry V had successfully taken another important city in Normandy following the siege of Caen.

Prelude
When the English reached Rouen, the walls were defended with 60 towers, each containing three cannons, and 6 gates protected by barbicans. The garrison of Rouen had been reinforced by 4,000 men and there were some 16,000 civilians willing to endure a siege. The defence was lined by an army of crossbow men under the command of Alain Blanchard, commander of the crossbows (arbalétriers), and second in command to Guy le Bouteiller, a Burgundian captain and the overall commander.

Siege
To besiege the city, Henry decided to set up four fortified camps and barricade the River Seine with iron chains, completely surrounding the city, with the English intending to starve out the defenders. The duke of Burgundy, John the Fearless, had captured Paris but did not make an attempt to save Rouen and advised citizens to look after themselves. By December, the inhabitants were eating cats, dogs, horses, and even mice. The streets were filled with starving citizens. The city expelled more than 12,000 of the poor to save food. Henry would not allow the people to leave the siege line, and so the starving, expelled people of Rouen were forced to live in the ditch dug near the city wall for its protection. Even the English felt sorry for the starving people. On Christmas Day 1418, King Henry allowed two priests to give food to the starving people, but the day soon ended and the people went back to dying miserably in the ditch.

Despite several sorties led by the French garrison, this state of affairs continued. On New Year's Eve, Boutellier asked for negotiations with the English. Following ten days of negotiation, the French defenders decided they would surrender on 19 January 1419 if no help had arrived. The surviving French would be allowed to keep their homes and property if they gave up 80 hostages, paid 300,000 gold crowns, and swore allegiance to the English. Alain Blanchard, who had executed English prisoners, was executed by the English when the city fell.

Aftermath
Henry went on to take all of Normandy, apart from Mont-Saint-Michel, which withstood blockade. Rouen became the main English base in northern France, allowing Henry to launch campaigns on Paris, and further south into the country.

Citations

References

 
 
 
 
 

1418 in England
1419 in England
1410s in France
Rouen 1418
Rouen 1418
Rouen 1418
Military history of Normandy
Henry V of England
History of Rouen
Conflicts in 1418
Conflicts in 1419
Hundred Years' War, 1415–1453